Janette Toral is a Filipino practicing e-commerce, social media, and Internet marketing specialist. She is also a facilitator, blogger, lobbyist, business and social entrepreneur, educator, researcher, writer, ambassador, community leader, and business leader. She has been dubbed as the "mother of e-commerce law in the Philippines".

Advocacy
Toral is an active volunteer working on the Philippines E-Commerce Roadmap (2016 to 2020), actively presenting it in various local and international fora for various stakeholder consultation initiatives. Toral was one of the plaintiffs in the 2014 landmark case Disini v. Secretary of Justice.

Business interests
Toral founded the Philippine Internet Commerce Society in 1997. She lobbied for the Y2K Law and E-Commerce Law which were eventually passed in the year 2000, making it easier for companies in the Philippines to do online businesses globally.

Toral's personal website, DigitalFilipino.com, was founded in September 1999, to promote her e-commerce book and Philippine internet documentary.

She started the DigitalFilipino Club in 2003, also to promote her second e-commerce book and Philippine internet documentary.

In 2006, Toral created the DigitalFilipino.com Podcast, co produced with Pocholo Gonzales of Creative Voices Productions, which had 13 episodes.

In 2007 she launched the DigitalFilipino Web Awards, which, with different categories, is given yearly to the best Filipino websites.

Since 2003 Toral has also been writing a weekly business column for Sun.Star Cebu.

Since 2002 she has been campaigning for the application of capability maturity model integration (CMMI) in the Philippines, which would ensure higher-quality software development in the country and make the Philippines compete effectively in the international market. Toral's goal of making the country dependent on its own CMMI trainers and assessors has still to be realized.

Writings

The DigitalFilipino Stats Report
Toral first published the Digital Filipino Stat report in 2002. The issues spoke about the importance of IT to users.

The third of a series of regular survey results of DigitalFilipino in 2002 shows that the internet has grown in importance to users. Internet users in the Philippines seem to have shifted from toy and communication services to research and business tools. The survey allows entrepreneurs to make more important decisions in their strategies and operations on the services offered.

Over 40% of those surveyed said that the internet was used basically for research. Twenty percent said that email was the main reason for using the internet. Sixty percent were accessing the internet in their place of work, and were not limited to big companies alone but had spread to small and medium enterprises. All these users were also shopping online. This issue is concerned mainly with the use of the internet and shopping behavior online.

The second issue speaks of mobile phone users in the Philippines, which is considered as a wireless champion due to the acceptance of users in the short messaging service (SMS). Almost 17% of Filipinos have prepaid or postpaid subscriptions to mobile services. Telecom providers all over Asia have used the Philippines as a model in the development of added services on SMS usage.

The fourth issue talks about the latest in e-services. According to Toral's latest survey in 2003, Secretary Manuel Roxas had been the best evangelist in promoting the outsourcing industry, referring to e-services like contact centers and medical transcriptions. According to the stats report, 21% of those surveyed were satisfied with the support that the government was giving the e-service industry. They were also satisfied with the efforts given to improve the quality of education and skilled workers, the opening of IT parks, and with the incentives provided for related campaigns on IT.

Another issue of the 2003 DigitalFilipino Stats Report, entitled "The Filipino Internet banker," states that more than half a million Filipinos would regularly bank online. Convenience, time, and resource saving were the principal factors for using online banking services, which included inquiries on accounts, transfer of funds, and payment of bills. Most internet users banking online were young, 68% being males. Internet banking has become an effective tool in acquiring clients who are ready to spend money.

Other writings and publications

Awards

References

Living people
Filipino marketing people
Date of birth missing (living people)
Filipino bloggers
Filipino women bloggers
Filipino lobbyists
Filipino women writers
Writers from Manila
Year of birth missing (living people)